The Lodi dynasty was the last dynasty to rule over Emirate of Multan, from their capital city of Multan in the 10th century.

History
The Lodi dynasty was founded by Hamid Khan Lodi or Hamid Lawi, who was supposedly a descendant of Sama (or Usama) Lawi who was son of Ghalib Lawi. Although Firishta claimed that they were from the Lodi tribe of Pashtuns, historians Yogendra Mishra and Henry George Raverty claimed they were Quraysh Arabs. Al-Masudi who visited Multan after 912 AD states that the ruler Abu Lahab al-Munabbah bin Asad al-Qarshi was descended from the clan of Usama or Sama bin Lu'ayy bin Ghalib. Hudud al-'Alam mentions that the ruler was a Quraishite. Ibn Hawqal who visited Multan in 367 AH also mentions that the rulers were the descendant of Sama bin Loi bin Ghalib. According to Raverty and Samuel Miklos Stern, the Lodi dynasty itself might have been fabricated as its mention only starts appearing with later historians like Firishta.

Banu Lawi rose to power after Jalam Ibn Shayam, the previous Ismaili Da'i, had overthrown the Banu Munabbih who were ruling the Emirate of Multan previously in 959. After his death, Hamid Lawi became Emir of Multan. According to Firishta, Sabuktigin had started raiding into Multan and Lamghan for slaves during the reign of Alp-Tegin in Ghazni. This led to the creation of an alliance between Jayapala, the king of the Hindu Shahi of Kabul, Hamid Lawi, and the king of Bhatiya. He states that Jayapala ceded Lamghan and Multan to Hamid in return for the alliance.

After becoming the amir in Ghazni in 977 AD, Sabuktigin entered into an agreement of non-hostility with Hamid Lodi, who according to Firishta agreed to acknowledge him as his overlord. Mishra states that Hamid's submission is unlikely, though Sabuktigin likely succeeded in dissolving his alliance with the Hindu kings through diplomacy. Hamid might have taken over the rule of the city of Multan itself after the death of Jalam ibn Shaban, the Fatimid da'i who had gained control of the city after defeating the Banu Munabbih and might have died sometime after 985 AD.

Hamid's grandson and successor, Fateh Daud, abandoned his allegiance to the Ghaznavids however after seeing Sabuktigin's son and successor Mahmud defeat Jayapala in 1001 AD and the king of Bhatiya in 1004 AD. He entered into a defence alliance with Anandapala, son and successor of Jayapala. Mahmud marched against Multan in 1006 AD due to its Ismaili element and Daud turning against him. Anandapala attempted to block his advance but was defeated. Mahmud besieged Multan for a week and forced Daud to renounce his Ismaili views, while also receiving a tribute of 20,000 dirhams. He soon departed for Khorasan to repel the invasion of Ilak Khan, and left Sukhpala, alias "Nawasa Shah", as the governor of the newly conquered territory. According to another version, Daud retired with his treasure to Serandip and Mahmud after conquering the city fined its inhabitants 20,000 dirhams as tribute.

In 1010 AD, Daud again rebelled against Mahmud, who marched on the city during his eighth invasion of India. Daud was defeated and imprisoned at the fort of Ghurak, situated between Ghazni and Lamghan, for the rest of his life.

Mahmud's son and successor Masʽud freed Daud's son al-Asghar from prison after being convinced by Rajpal ibn Sumar, who belonged to the house of Daud and whose Ismaili faction had dissociated from the pro-Fatimid faction. The Syrian Druze leader Baha al-Din al-Muqtana wrote a letter to ibn Sumar in 1034 AD, encouraging him to rebel against the Ghaznavids and restore the Ismaili rule. al-Ashgar secretly started leading an Ismaili faction and rebelled in 1041 AD after Masʽud died. His men succeeded in capturing the Multan Fort but were forced to abandon the city when the new Ghaznavid sultan Mawdud dispatched his forces against them. The fort was surrendered by the inhabitants, who agreed to perform the khutba in the names of the Abbasid caliph Al-Qadir and Mawdud.

Religion

The Lodi dynasty followed Ismailism, a sect considered as heretic by the orthodox Sunni Muslims. Hamid Khan Lodi may have been from a more tolerant faction of Ismailis than Jalam. The Lodis owed their allegiance to the Fatimid Caliphate and were targeted by Mahmud of Ghazni for their faith. According to Tarikh Yamini of al-Utbi, Fateh Daud had agreed to convert to the orthodox Sunni faith, but eventually abandoned it. Mahmud upon conquering Multan again massacred its Ismaili inhabitants. The congregational mosque built by Jalam on the site of Multan Sun Temple was left abandoned, while the old congregational mosque built by Muhammad ibn Qasim was reopened for prayers.

References

Medieval India
Ismaili dynasties
Dynasties of India
Punjab
Empires and kingdoms of India
History of Multan
Vassal rulers of the Fatimid Caliphate